Fintown (officially known by its Irish name) is a small village and townland on the banks of Lough Finn in County Donegal, Ireland. It is within the Gaeltacht, an Irish-speaking area, in the west of the county. The village was named after a mythological woman, Fionngheal, who drowned in the lake after attempting to save her wounded brother Feargamhain.

Demographics

Of these, 59% were Irish speakers.

Gallery

See also
 List of populated places in Ireland

References

External links
Fintown Railway

Gaeltacht places in County Donegal
Gaeltacht towns and villages
Towns and villages in County Donegal
Townlands of County Donegal